George W. Alschuler (April 20, 1864 – November 5, 1936) was an American businessman and politician.

Alschuler was born in Quincy, Illinois and went to the Aurora public schools. He was involved in the insurance and real estate business. Alschuler served on the Aurora City Council from 1899 to 1903. He then served as mayor of Aurora from 1901 to 1903. Alschuler was a  Democrat. He served in the Illinois House of Representatives from 1909 to 1913. His brother United States Circuit Court judge Samuel Alschuler also served in the Illinois General Assembly. Alschuler died in an automobile accident in Aurora, Illinois when the automobile hit a telephone pole.

Notes

External links

1864 births
1936 deaths
People from Aurora, Illinois
Businesspeople from Illinois
Illinois city council members
Mayors of places in Illinois
Democratic Party members of the Illinois House of Representatives
Road incident deaths in Illinois